Pedro Gasset i Parrilla (22 July 1924 – 12 August 2012) was a Spanish field hockey player. He competed in the 1948 Summer Olympics. He was born in Terrassa.

He was a member of the Spanish field hockey team, which was eliminated in the group stage. He played all three matches as forward in the tournament.

External links
 
profile 
Pedro Gasset's obituary 

1924 births
2012 deaths
Sportspeople from Terrassa
Spanish male field hockey players
Olympic field hockey players of Spain
Field hockey players at the 1948 Summer Olympics
Atlètic Terrassa players